Anne Mee Thompson is an American scientist, who specializes in atmospheric chemistry and climate change. Her work focuses on how human activities have changed the chemistry of the atmosphere, climate forcing, and the Earth's oxidizing capacity. Thompson is an elected fellow of the American Meteorological Society, American Geophysical Union, and AAAS.

Early life and education 
Thompson was born in Pennsylvania, but spent most of her youth growing up in New Jersey and New York State. She grew up in Chatham Township, New Jersey and graduated from Chatham Township High School. Thompson received her bachelor's degree in Chemistry, with honors, from Swarthmore College in 1970. She received her master's degree in chemistry from Princeton University in 1972 and then went on to get her Ph.D. in Physical Chemistry from Bryn Mawr College in 1978. She did postdoctoral research at Woods Hole Oceanographic Institution, then at UC San Diego with the Scripps Institution of Oceanography, and at the National Center for Atmospheric Research (NCAR), in Boulder, CO. During her postdoctoral work, Thompson's research focus shifted from physical chemistry to atmospheric chemistry, with influence from Ollie Zafiriou and Ralph Cicerone.

Career 
Thompson has worked as a Physical Scientist for NASA from 1986 to 2004, and she returned in 2013 and is now part of the Atmospheric Chemistry Dynamics group. In 1990, Thompson was on the Third Soviet-American Gas and Aerosols cruise which explored air-sea gas exchange and trace gases in remote marine areas. Thompson was co-mission scientist for NASA's 1997 DC-8 SINEX (SASS Ozone and Nitrogen Oxides Experiment) and PI for SHADOZ (Southern Hemisphere Additional Ozonesondes) which used airborne instruments such as weather balloons carrying ozonesonde packages to measure humidity, temperature and other atmospheric factors. Thompson has also conducted studies with fellow NASA scientist Bob Chatfield, to identify a wind current carrying human made pollution from Asia westward, creating areas of unusually high ozone levers far away from the true causes, these studies also use satellite and weather balloon data.

As of 2022, Thompson is an emeritus scientist at NASA and an adjunct professor of meteorology at Penn State University.

Selected publications

Awards 
 Fellow, American Meteorological Society (AMS)
 Fellow, American Association for the Advancement of Sciences (AAAS), 2002
 Fellow, American Geophysical Union (AGU), 2003
 The SHADOZ research team won a NASA honor award for group achievement, 2004
 Fulbright Scholar Award  which she used to study human pollution in South Africa, 2010
 American Meteorological Society's Verner Suomi Award for “exceptional vision and leadership in deploying technologies that have significantly advanced the understanding of ozone dynamics in the atmosphere,” 2012
 NASA Senior Goddard Fellow, 2014 
 Roger Revelle medal for “outstanding contributions in atmospheric sciences, atmosphere-ocean coupling, atmosphere-land coupling, biogeochemical cycles, climate, or related aspects of the Earth system," 2015
 Goddard's William Nordberg Memorial Award for Earth Sciences, 2018

References 

Bryn Mawr College alumni
Swarthmore College alumni
American climatologists
Women climatologists
Chatham High School (New Jersey) alumni
People from Chatham Township, New Jersey
21st-century American women writers
Fellows of the American Academy of Arts and Sciences
Fellows of the American Geophysical Union
Living people
Year of birth missing (living people)
Women atmospheric scientists